Richland School District 88A is an elementary and middle school district Crest Hill, Illinois, a suburb of Chicago.

Richland Elementary School has grades K-4. Richland Junior High School serves grades 5–8. High school students matriculate to Lockport Township High School. or Joliet Catholic Academy.

Student body
As of 2015 the school has 966 students: 36.9% of them are white, 31.7% are Hispanic, 5.4% are Asian, .3% are Pacific Islander, and 11.8% are of two or more races.

History
The original building was built in 1957 and is now where the 5th grade, Spanish, and superintendent office is. In 1968 two additional hallways were added which now serve LASEC,  6th grade, a gym and main office. Sometime in the 1980s another hallway was added which serves 7th and 8th graders. This addition made the school a square shape with a playground in the middle. In the early 2000s, due to overcrowding an additional two-story building was added to the school to serve Pre-K, kindergarten, 1st, 2nd, 3rd, and 4th graders. With this addition a dedicated choir/music room was added and so was the teachers lounge.

References

External links
 

School districts in Will County, Illinois
1957 establishments in Illinois
School districts established in 1957